Skidmore is an unincorporated community in Anne Arundel County, Maryland, United States. The community is the western terminus of the Chesapeake Bay Bridge as well as the location of Sandy Point State Park. Sandy Point Shoal Light was listed on the National Register of Historic Places in 2002.

References

Unincorporated communities in Anne Arundel County, Maryland
Unincorporated communities in Maryland
Maryland populated places on the Chesapeake Bay